Tamozawa Imperial Villa (田母沢御用邸, Tamozawa Goyōtei) is a former imperial summer residence in Nikkō, Tochigi Prefecture, Japan. 

It was constructed for Emperor Taishō in 1899 and served as a hide-out for emperor Hirohito during World War II. The former imperial residence is now open for the public as museum and garden. The villa is one of the largest wooden buildings of Japan and blends traditional Edo and early modern Meiji era and Taisho era architecture .

History 
The core of the Tamozawa Imperial Villa is the former Edo residence of the Kishu Tokugawa clan. Under the name ‘Akasaka Riyu’, this residence became imperial property in 1872, being used by both the emperor as well as the crown prince until 1898. All former Tokugawa symbols replaced the imperial “chrysanthemum” symbol. The residence was brought over from Tokyo to Nikko in 1899, and the villa was erected around it as summer residence for then crown prince Taisho. The villa also incorporates the villa of banker Kobayashi Nempo, on which grounds the residence is built.

During World War II, the villa was a hide-out for emperor Hirohito. Also emperor Akihito stayed as an evacuee in the residence for more than a year starting 1944. After 1947, the imperial family did not use the villa anymore and it fell into oblivion. After major renovation work by the Tochigi Prefectural Government, the villa was opened as museum for the public.

Architecture 
The villa is one of the largest wooden buildings of Japan and counts 106 rooms, most of which were used by the imperial court. The interior is a blend of Japanese and Western design, mixing carpet floor, chandeliers with sliding doors as well as tatami flooring. The villa is surrounded by a large park, currently only one quarter of what it was in its heyday.

Bibliography 
 https://www.park-tochigi.com/tamozawa/wp/wp-content/uploads/2016/07/tamozawa_gaikoku.pdf

External links 

 https://www.park-tochigi.com/tamozawa/    Official website of the museum
 https://www.japan-guide.com/e/e3808.html
 https://thomasgittel.wordpress.com/2010/09/13/nikko-tamozawa-goyotei-%E2%80%93-%E6%97%A5%E5%85%89%E7%94%B0%E6%AF%8D%E6%B2%A2%E5%BE%A1%E7%94%A8%E9%82%B8/

Buildings and structures in Tochigi Prefecture
Emperor Taishō